The following lists events that happened in 2002 in Iceland.

Incumbents
President – Ólafur Ragnar Grímsson 
Prime Minister – Davíð Oddsson

Events 

 Establishment of the Reykjavík Mosque.

References 

 
2000s in Iceland
Iceland
Iceland
Years of the 21st century in Iceland